The Oregon Garden is an  botanical garden and tourist attraction in Silverton, Oregon, United States. Opened in 1999, it is home to over 20 gardens including the Rose Garden, Children's Garden and Silverton Market Garden. It is open 365 days a year and hosts both public and private events. The land is also home to the Gordon House, Oregon's only Frank Lloyd Wright home, and The Oregon Garden Resort.

History

The Oregon Association of Nurseries first conceived the idea of a public showcase garden in the 1940s. Work towards the creation of such a garden began in earnest around 1990, when the OAN began seeking a location for their project. Around that same time, the City of Silverton was searching for a way to use their reclaimed wastewater. These serendipitous situations led Silverton to purchase the land south of downtown and dedicate it to the future garden in 1995. As a result, Silverton's wastewater is filtered through a series of terraced wetlands located in the garden, collected in a holding tank and used to meet all of the garden's irrigation needs. In April 1996, a master plan was created for the garden which includes ultimately developing all  of the site. The groundbreaking ceremony occurred June 27, 1997, and featured high-ranking Oregon politicians.  The garden opened to the public during a dedication on April 17, 1999. Attendance at the garden totaled 250,000 visitors the first year. Subsequent ceremonies dedicated additional features such as the Gordon House on March 2, 2002, and the Rediscovery Forest and Natural Resources Center on June 7, 2002.

In 2002, the water garden won an award from the American Society of Landscape Architects for environmental friendliness.

Funding

The Oregon Garden faced a series of financial hardships throughout its early years, but through the support of its partners has become a successful destination attracting visitors from Oregon and beyond. Initial development saw a relatively ambitious series of garden expansions. This, combined with lower than expected attendance, quickly depleted the project's funds. Financial contributions from the Oregon Lottery, City of Silverton, and Marion County have helped keep it functioning.

In 2005, Marion County issued $5 million in bonds to support the attraction. In 2005, the Oregon Garden Foundation placed the garden in receivership as attendance had declined to 40,000 people that year with a delinquent debt of $8 million. For 2006, the Garden lost $1.1 million with a revenue of less than $275,000.
The garden nearly closed due to its financial obligations.

To ensure financial solvency, a deal was struck with Moonstone Garden Management Incorporated in 2006 in which the company would take over operations of the garden, with the Oregon Garden Foundation retaining ownership.  Moonstone purchased  from the City of Silverton to build a 103-room resort hotel on undeveloped land adjacent to the garden's water feature.  The deal—set to last as long as 75 years—has Moonstone progressively repaying the $5 million bond from garden and resort revenue.
The  resort opened September 1, 2008.

Plans to develop adjacent land to expand the Oregon Garden appear to be abandoned with a proposal to develop the  property southwest of the site into an urban park called Pettit Natural Area Demonstration Urban Natural Area.

Features

As of 2005, the Oregon Garden includes more than twenty specialty gardens and features such as the Bosque, Children's Garden, Conifer Garden (one of the largest collections of dwarf and miniature conifers in the United States), Honor Garden, Hughes Water Garden, Jackson & Perkins Rose Garden, Lewis & Clark Garden, Northwest Garden, Pet Friendly Garden, and Sensory Garden. The water garden is a maze-like area with numerous paths and bridges. A  native Oregon white oak grove includes the 400-year-old,  Signature Oak, which is one of Oregon's Heritage Trees.  The garden holds an annual festival each autumn. Also on the grounds is the Teufel Amphitheater which hosts concerts and other events; Sam Bush played in the Amphitheater in 2006.

Gordon House, the only house Frank Lloyd Wright designed in Oregon, is now on the grounds of Oregon Garden.  The house, designed in 1957, is one of Wright's Usonian houses, and the only Wright house open to the public in the Pacific Northwest. Completed in 1964, the home was moved from Wilsonville, Oregon, to the garden in 2001.

On each Earth Day since 1999, the Garden hosts a celebration which attracts environmental supporters and organizations with demonstrations, exhibitions, and workshops.  Garden admission is free for this event.

Using treated wastewater from the city, the garden is one of only a few installations in the United States that reuses wastewater for a water feature. Even in the summer months, the garden does not draw on drinking water supplies, instead relying entirely on wastewater treatment plant effluent, which additionally irrigates  of farmland. Until recently, such use was prohibited by state law, but the law was revised partly due to this water reclamation project. The garden also provides wetland mitigation for a nearby industrial park to provide waterfowl and amphibian habitat, and offloads Silver Creek from water it would not naturally carry during low-flow months in the summer to address an Oregon Department of Environmental Quality requirement. The end result is extremely high quality treated water.

Gallery

See also
 List of botanical gardens in the United States

Notes

References

External links

 Oregon Garden (official website)
 Oregon Garden has Growing Pains
 Garden gives up control: Marion County and Silverton to take over management

1999 establishments in Oregon
Botanical gardens in Oregon
Parks in Marion County, Oregon
Silverton, Oregon